The PSE Trail, also called the Puget Power Trail and the Redmond Powerline Trail, is an unpaved equestrian, pedestrian and mountain bike trail in Redmond, Washington.  It  links the Sammamish River Trail to Farrel-McWhirter Park.

References

External links
 City of Redmond

Geography of King County, Washington
Mountain biking venues in the United States
Parks in Redmond, Washington